is a bank founded in 1923 and based in Tokyo, Japan. It was established on 3 August 1923. , the bank has 164 branches in Tokyo, Saitama, and Chiba Prefectures. The bank offers customers housing loans, car loans, and loans to finance education, as well as services to companies doing business internationally. , the bank was planning to offer reverse mortgages to customers.

See also
List of banks
List of banks in Japan

References

External links
  

Banks of Japan
1923 establishments in Japan
Financial services companies based in Tokyo